Islam is one of the smallest minority faiths in Belize, which is a predominantly Christian country. The statistics for Islam in Belize estimate a total Muslim population of 577, representing 0.2 percent of the total population. There is an Islamic Mission of Belize (IMB) headquartered in Belize City. There is also presence of fast growing dynamic worldwide Ahmadiyya Muslim Jamaat since 2013. They have a membership of about 200 from all over Belize.They have three mosques in Belize. Masjid Noor in Belize City is situated on 1.5 Miles George Price Highway. They have mosques in Belmopan and Orange Walk. . 
The Muslim Community Primary School (MCPS) was recognised by the government in 1978 and offers Islamic as well as elementary level academic courses to Muslim and non-Muslim children.

Mosques
 Al-Falah Mosque

References

 
Belize